Colin Miller may refer to:

Colin Miller (cricketer) (born 1964), Australian Test bowler
Colin Miller (ice hockey, born 1971), Canadian ice hockey player
Colin Miller (ice hockey, born 1992), Canadian ice hockey player
Colin Miller (soccer, born 1964), former Canadian soccer player
Colin Miller (soccer, born 1996), American soccer player
Col Miller (politician) (born 1924), Australian politician